The 1999 Saskatchewan Scott Tournament of Hearts women's provincial curling championship, was held January 27–31 at the Weyburn Colosseum in Weyburn, Saskatchewan. The winning team of Cindy Street, represented Saskatchewan at the 1999 Scott Tournament of Hearts in Charlottetown, Prince Edward Island, where the team finished round robin with a 7-4 record, before losing the 3-4 game to Team Canada's Cathy Borst. This was also the last provincial tournament appearance for former Canadian, World and Olympic Champion Sandra Schmirler, who died in 2000 from cancer.

Teams

Standings

Results

Draw 1
January 27, 7:00 PM CT

Draw 2
January 28, 9:30 AM CT

Draw 3
January 28, 2:00 PM CT

Draw 4
January 29, 9:30 AM CT

Draw 5
January 29, 2:00 PM CT

Draw 6
January 29, 7:00 PM CT

Draw 7
January 30, 9:30 AM CT

Playoffs

Semifinal
January 30, 7:00 PM CT

Final
January 31, 2:00 PM CT

References

Archived website

Saskatchewan Scotties Tournament Of Hearts, 1999
1999 in Canadian curling
Curling in Saskatchewan
Weyburn
January 1999 sports events in Canada